Beste Zangers, formerly De beste zangers van Nederland (English: The Best Singers (of the Netherlands)), is a Dutch reality television show by public broadcaster AVROTROS (a merger of AVRO and TROS,  both part of the Netherlands Public Broadcasting). The first series was aired between 5 July and 30 August 2009 and was hosted by Edsilia Rombley. She was first replaced by singer and actor Victor Reinier  (2010, 2011) before Jan Smit became the permanent host from 2012 to 2019.

In each series a number of well-known performers take turns as the central artist in the hot seat that gets honoured by the other artists by singing songs that are of significance to that person. It can be a cover of one of his/her own songs, a song that inspires the artist in the hot seat or something from his/her past. In earlier seasons, the central artist decided who had to sing which song, while in later seasons the artists could pick one from a list themselves. The artist in the hot seat ranks the performances and picks a favourite performance, which results in that person being the winner of the episode. The first six seasons also have a final episode where they discuss and vote on their favourites. Later the voting became less important and they stopped doing this. In season 10 they introduced a final episode where the artists sing duets. The show format has since been used in other European countries: Denmark, Norway, Sweden, Finland, Germany, Belgium, Lithuania, Estonia and Switzerland.

In July 2017 two compilations were broadcast in celebration of Beste Zangers'  tenth anniversary.

Summary

Season 1 (2009)
The first season the series broadcast from 5 July 2009 to 30 August 2009, and hosted by Edsilia Rombley. Seven Dutch artists (Henk Westbroek, Gordon, Albert West, Danny de Munk, Nick Schilder, Simon Keizer and Thomas Berge) sang songs from each other's repertoire. The episodes were recorded in four days on Ibiza, accompanied by a live band playing the songs.

Episode 1 - Henk Westbroek

Winner: Albert West

Episode 2 - Simon Keizer

Winner: Danny de Munk

Episode 3 - Danny de Munk

Winner: Nick Schilder

Episode 4 - Gordon

Winner: Nick Schilder

Episode 5 - Thomas Berge

Winner: Henk Westbroek

Episode 6 - Albert West

Winner: Thomas Berge

Episode 7 - Nick Schilder

Winner - Henk Westbroek

Episode 8
In the final episode, the singers are asked to look back at their performances. In addition, they are allowed to choose another eventual replacement and give him/her an extra point. This showed that Simon Keizer was the eventual overall winner of the program by 2 extra points.

Season 2 (2010)
The second season was broadcast from 18 July 2010 to 16 September 2010 and hosted by Victor Reinier. Seven Dutch artists (Frans Bauer, Frans Duijts, Jamai, Jan Dulles, Jeroen van der Boom, René Froger and Syb van der Ploeg) sang songs from each other's repertoire. The episodes were recorded in Ibiza, accompanied by a live band playing the songs.

Episode 1 - Jeroen van der Boom

Winner: Frans Duijts

Episode 2 - Jamai Loman

Winner: Syb van der Ploeg

Episode 3 - René Froger

Winner: Jan Dulles

Episode 4 - Syb van der Ploeg

Winner - Jan Dulles

Episode 5 - Jan Dulles

Winner: Jeroen van der Boom

Episode 6 - Frans Duijts

Winner - René Froger

Episode 7 - Frans Bauer

Winner - René Froger

Episode 8 - Final
the final episode was a look back at previous performances to decide on an overall winner for the second season.

Who voted for whom

Number of votes

Overall Winner: Jamai Loman

Season 3 (2011)
The third season ran from 19 March 2011 to 7 May 2011 and was hosted for a second year in a row by Victor Reinier. 2011 participating artists were Xander de Buisonjé, Lange Frans, Wolter Kroes, Anita Meyer, Glennis Grace, Peter Koelewijn, George Baker and the singer Do.

Episode 1 - Peter Koelewijn

Winner: Xander de Buisonjé

Episode 2 - Xander de Buisonjé

Winner: Glennis Grace

Episode 3 - Anita Meyer

Winner: Lange Frans

Episode 4 - Do

Winner: Glennis Grace

Episode 5 - Lange Frans

Winner: Peter Koelewijn

Episode 6 - George Baker

Winner: Anita Meyer

Episode 7 - Wolter Kroes

Winner: Do

Episode 8 - Glennis Grace

Winner: Xander de Buisonjé

Episode 9 - Final
Participants look back at the performances and nominate their overall favorites and give points

Who voted for whom

Number of votes

Overall Winner: Anita Meyer

Season 4 (2012)

The fourth season was broadcast from 2 May 2012 to 13 June 2012. Jan Smit took over as the host. The participating Dutch artists for the fourth season were Gerard Joling, Ruth Jacott, Berget Lewis, Nikki Kerkhof, Peter Beense, Freek Bartels and Yes-R.

Episode 1 - Gerard Joling

Winner: Berget Lewis

Episode 2 - Ruth Jacott

Winner: Yes-R

Episode 3 - Yes-R

Winner: Nikki Kerkhof

Episode 4 - Freek Bartels

Winner: Berget Lewis

Episode 5 - Berget Lewis

Winner: Peter Beense

Episode 6 - Peter Beense

Winner: Berget Lewis

Episode 7 - Nikki Kerkhof

Winner: Berget Lewis

Episode 8 - Final
The participants look back at earlier performances and nominate for best singer overall giving points

Who voted for who?

Number of votes:

Overall Winner: Berget Lewis

Season 5 (2013)
The fifth season featured Simone Kleinsma, Charly Luske, Rob de Nijs, Angela Groothuizen, Tim Douwsma, Bastiaan Ragas and Raffaëla Paton. 
Episode 1 - Raffaëla Paton

Winner: Rob de Nijs

Episode 2 - Charly Luske

Winner: Raffaëla Paton

Episode 3 - Bastiaan Ragas

Winner: Simone Kleinsma

Episode 4 - Angela Groothuizen

Winner: Raffaëlla Paton

Episode 5 - Simone Kleinsma

Winner: Angela Groothuizen

Episode 6 - Tim Douwsma

Winner: Charly Luske

Episode 7 - Rob de Nijs

Winner: Rafaëlla Paton

Episode 8 - Final
Who voted for whom

Number of votes

Overall Winner: Rafaëlla Paton

Season 6 (Spring 2014)

Niels Geusebroek, Lisa Lois, Sabrina Starke, Jack Poels, Ben Saunders, Mattanja Joy Bradley, Leona Philippo and Dave von Raven, with Sabrina Starke winning the series.

Season 7 (Winter 2014)

René Froger, André Hazes Jr., Monique Klemann, Xander de Buisonjé, Carolina Dijkhuizen and Edsilia Rombley took part with André Hazes Jr. winning the series.

Season 8 (2015)

Jan Keizer, Anouk Maas, Frans Duijts, Lange Frans, Martin Buitenhuis, Julia Zahra and Do took part in the series. Frans Duijts and Julia Zahra were joint winners.

Season 9 (2016)

René van Kooten, Willeke Alberti, Brownie Dutch, Sharon Doorson, O'G3NE and Jeroen van der Boom took part with Willeke Alberti winning the season.

Season 10 (2017)

Anita Meyer, Brace, Kenny B, Maan, Tommie Christiaan, Tania Kross and Dennie Christian took part in the series. Anita Meyer and Tania Kross jointly won the series

Season 11 (2018)
Lee Towers, Trijntje Oosterhuis, Alain Clark, Tino Martin, Glen Faria, Maria Fiselier and Davina Michelle took part. Lee Towers and Trijntje Oosterhuis jointly won the series.

Season 12 (2019)
After having started hosting the show since season 4 in 2012, this 12th series became the last consecutive to be hosted by the singer Jan Smith until his return in 2021. Smith hosted for a total of 9 consecutive seasons in a span of 8 years. The singers taking part were Emma Heesters, Floor Jansen, Henk Poort, Rolf Sanchez, Ruben Annink, Samantha Steenwijk and Tim Akkerman. Rolf Sanchez and Samantha Steenwijk were the joint winners for the season.

Season 13 (2020)
New hosts Nick & Simon took over hosting for Jan Smit, as he had been sick during filming this season. The participating singers are: Diggy Dex, Milow, Sanne Hans known as Miss Montreal, Stef Bos, Suzan & Freek, Tabitha and Wulf. Stef Bos was the winner of the season.

Season 14 (2021) 
Jan Smit returned as host after being sick during the previous season. This is the first season since season 3 to not be hosted in Ibiza, due to the ongoing COVID-19 pandemic. Instead, it was hosted in Limburg. The participating singers are: Roel van Velzen, Bökkers, Belle Perez, Alides Hidding, Karsu, Joe Buck, and Anneke van Giersbergen. The winners of the season were Bökkers and Roel van Velzen.

Season 15 (2022) 

This season took place in Seville, Spain. The cast includes: Blanks, Claudia de Breij, Ferdi Bolland, Jaap Reesema, Nielson, Roxeanne Hazes, and Sarita Lorena.

See also
The Best Singers (series)

References

Dutch reality television series
Dutch music television series
2009 Dutch television series debuts
NPO 1 original programming